G41, G-41 or G.41 may refer to:

 Military references 

 Gewehr 41, a German rifle used in World War II
 Heckler & Koch G41, a German assault rifle
 HMS Panther (G41), a United Kingdom Royal Navy destroyer which saw service during World War II
 SMS G41, an Imperial German Navy torpedo boat

 Commercial products 

 Victorian Railways G class locomotive number
 IBM ThinkPad G41, a model of the G-series ThinkPads, which were used as desktop replacements
 Intel G41 chipset for desktop computers